Pratt's vole (Eothenomys chinensis) is a species of rodent in the family Cricetidae.
It is endemic to Mount Emei, Sichuan, China. It was named in 1891 for Antwerp Edgar Pratt.

References

Musser, G. G. and M. D. Carleton. 2005. Superfamily Muroidea. pp. 894–1531 in Mammal Species of the World a Taxonomic and Geographic Reference. D. E. Wilson and D. M. Reeder eds. Johns Hopkins University Press, Baltimore.

Eothenomys
Rodents of China
Mammals described in 1891
Taxa named by Oldfield Thomas
Taxonomy articles created by Polbot
Endemic fauna of Sichuan